Recon was an American Christian metal band that originated in California in 1987.

Background 

Recon was a Christian power metal band that originated in Los Angeles in 1987. The band has been compared to fellow Christian power metal bands, such as Stryper, Saint and Sacred Warrior. Many of the past members have been in bands such as Vengeance Rising, Deliverance, Worldview and Shades of Crimson. The band later became Worldview in 2013, stated by former Recon and Sacred Warrior vocalist Rey Perra along with George Ochoa.

Discography 
Studio albums
 Behind Enemy Lines (1990)

Demos
 Recon (1989)
 Recon '90 (1990)

Live
 Live at Cornerstone 2001 (2001)

Split videos
 Live at Cornerstone 2001 (2001)

References

External links 
 
 
 

American Christian metal musical groups
Musical groups established in 1987
Musical groups disestablished in 1990
Musical groups reestablished in 2001
Musical groups disestablished in 2001
Musical groups reestablished in 2002
Musical groups disestablished in 2007